Leah Rosenthal  (1879 - 4 October 1930) was an Australian nurse who served in World War I.

Biography 
Rosenthal was born in Melbourne in 1879, the daughter of Joseph Rosenthal and Martha Avinsky. She trained as a nurse at the Alfred Hospital in Melbourne, where she met and became friends with Isabella Jobson. In late 1910, the two women took over the running of Windarra Private Hospital in Toorak. They left the hospital, and Australia, together in December 1915 and travelled to England to serve in World War I.

In England, they joined Queen Alexandra's Royal Army Nursing Corps (QAIMNS), and in February 1916 they were assigned to Baythorpe Military Hospital in Nottingham. In April of that year, they embarked for duty in France. Rosenthal was assigned to various stationary hospitals and casualty clearing stations and served until April 1919 when she resigned her position. She returned to Melbourne in May 1919, and she and Jobson again bought a private hospital to run together. The hospital had previously been named St Luke’s Private Hospital, however Jobson and Rosenthal re-named it Vimy House, perhaps after the site of the Battle of Vimy Ridge, one of the battlegrounds where the pair had nursed in France during the war.

Rosenthal was awarded the Military Medal and the Royal Red Cross for her service in France. She died in 1930. The following year, Jobson inaugurated an annual prize in her name for nurses at the Alfred Hospital, the Leah Rosenthal prize for best theatre nurse of the year.

References

1879 births
1930 deaths
Australian military nurses
Australian women of World War I
Members of the Royal Red Cross
Australian recipients of the Military Medal